CP6 or CP-6 may refer to:

 CP6 (classification), a disability sport classification specific to cerebral palsy
 CP6 (satellite), a satellite operated by California Polytechnic State University
 Honeywell CP-6, a discontinued computer operating system
 CP6, a Network Rail Control Period (2019–2024) of railway infrastructure in Great Britain
 CP6, an EEG electrode site in the 10-20 system

See also 
 .срб, a top-level domain for Serbia